Richard Kelly, also known by the nickname "Kel", is an English former professional rugby league footballer who played for Wakefield Trinity [Heritage Number 925] from 1982–1992, and Dewsbury Rams in 1993 and 1994, as a , or .

Richard Kelly was born in Wakefield, West Riding of Yorkshire, England, he is the youngest of three brothers to have played professionally, with brothers Neil Kelly, Wakefield Trinity, Dewsbury Rams, Hunslet, Featherstone Rovers and Andrew "Andy" Kelly Wakefield Trinity, Hull Kingston Rovers, Illawarra Steelers (Australia).

Playing career

Wakefield Trinity
1982-1992
A product of Wakefield Trinity's youth system and Colts 19s team, Richard Kelly made his professional début just three days after his 17th birthday, he went on to make a further 14 appearances that season scoring one try in an away victory over Whitehaven.

Dewsbury Rams
1993-1995

References

External links
 Wildcats Appoint Kelly Head of Youth
 Kelly Continues Family Ties
 Richard Kelly Voted Wakefield's Fan of Pride
2011 Crusaders Withdraw, Kelly has his say
2011 Former Wakefield Player Richard Kelly Praises New Owner
2011 Kelly Thanks Wildcats Staff
2011 Kelly Says Trinity Fans are Shaken
Wakefield Trinity Player Debuts see 1982/3
First Try Vs Whitehaven Away
1982/3 Squad Summary

1965 births
Living people
English rugby league players
Wakefield Trinity players
Rugby league players from Wakefield
Dewsbury Rams players
Rugby league five-eighths